Bad Acid Trip is an American metal band currently signed to System of a Down lead singer Serj Tankian's record label Serjical Strike Records. Their 2004 album, Lynch the Weirdo, was produced by Daron Malakian, another System of a Down member. In 2006, they performed on the second stage at the Ozzfest summer tour. The band has three full-length releases (For the Weird by the Weird, Lynch the Weirdo, and Humanly Possible) and multiple EPs.

Biography
Bad Acid Trip was formed in North Hollywood, California, in 1989 during the beginnings of the West Coast power violence scene. The current members of Bad Acid Trip are Dirk Rogers, Carlos Neri and Caleb Schneider. Original members Dirk Rogers and Keith Aazami have collaborated for more than 10 years. Bad Acid Trip has toured in support of various bands including System of a Down, the Mars Volta, Mindless Self Indulgence, the Dillinger Escape Plan, Dog Fashion Disco, Tub Ring, Motograter, Watch Them Die, and Gwar. Other bands they have shared the stage with include Slayer, Arch Enemy, Cypress Hill, Hatebreed, Brujeria, Body Count, Buckethead, Tom Morello, Circle One, and Napalm Death.

MTV 2's Headbangers Ball television show broadcast the music video "Beef Moo", a song featured on the album Lynch the Weirdo.

The EP Symbiotic Slavery was released on August 18, 2009, in order to fill the large gap between Lynch the Weirdo and Humanly Possible. The band released their third studio album, Humanly Possible, on May 3, 2011.

Members

Current members
 Dirk Rogers – vocals
 Caleb Schneider – bass, vocals
 Carlos Neri – drums

Former members
* Keith Aazami — guitar, vocals

 James Garren – drums
 Phil Hernandez – drums (Formerly of Sepsism, currently with The Dead Previal)
 Chris Mackie – bass
 Jose Perez – drums
 Damian Talmadge – bass
 Mike Thrashead — drums
 Joe Whitehouse – guitar

Discography

Studio albums
1999: For the Weird by the Weird (reissued on Serjical Strike Records in 2004)
2004: Lynch the Weirdo
2011: Humanly Possible
2015: Worship of Fear
2022: Taught to Fear

EPs
2009: Symbiotic Slavery

7-inch EPs
1995: B.A.T. Live at the Fudge: one sided split with anyone
1999: Remember EP
 B.A.T. split with Laceration
1995: B.A.T. split with Agathocles
 B.A.T. split with Kung-fu Rick
2000: B.A.T. split with Benümb
2002: Tango and Thrash B.A.T. split with Municipal Waste

Tape demos
1989–1992: 12 Pack and a Dime Demo
1993: 4-Ken Demo
1994: Live at the Hong Kong
1995: Bad Acid Trip Demo
1997: Live Love Songs for Repressed Apes

Other appearances
Dirk Rogers and Keith Aazami both appear on the songs "Funbus" and "Nottingham Lace" on the Buckethead & Friends album Enter the Chicken.

References

External links
Official site
Official Bad Acid Trip Facebook
Serjical Strike Records

Heavy metal musical groups from California
Political music groups
American grindcore musical groups
Musical groups established in 1989